The simple station Mandalay is part of the TransMilenio mass-transit system of Bogotá, Colombia, which opened in the year 2000.

Location

The station is located in southwestern Bogotá, specifically on Avenida de Las Américas with Carrera 73.

History
In 2003, the Las Américas line was extended from Distrito Grafiti to Transversal 86, including this station.

The station is named Mandalay due to the neighborhood located to the south of the station.

Station services

Old trunk services

Main line service

Feeder routes

This station does not have connections to feeder routes.

Inter-city service

This station does not have inter-city service.

External links
TransMilenio

See also
Bogotá
TransMilenio
List of TransMilenio Stations

TransMilenio